Keith Koehl is an American Roman Catholic priest of the Diocese of Austin in Texas, United States, and former Vice Rector of the Holy Trinity Seminary in Irving, Texas.

Biography 
Keith Koehl was born and grew up in La Grange, Texas, United States. He attended Holy Trinity Seminary from August 1990 through May 1992 as a pre-theologian, and major seminary at St. Mary’s Seminary in Houston, Texas. He was ordained to the priesthood for the Diocese of Austin on May 24, 1997.

Before Holy Trinity Seminary, Koehl served as the pastor of St. Patrick’s Catholic Church in Hutto, Texas (2006-2016), overseeing the establishment of its new church site and parish offices as the parish grew to over 600 families. His previous assignments include parochial vicar at St. Mary’s Catholic Center, a campus ministry at Texas A&M University in College Station (2001-2006), as well as parochial vicar at St. Thomas More Catholic Church (Austin, Texas) (1997-2001).

References

External links 
 Biography on Holy Trinity Seminary website
 St. Patrick Catholic Church website

Living people
People from La Grange, Texas
20th-century American Roman Catholic priests
Religious leaders from Texas
University of St. Thomas (Texas) alumni
University of Texas at Austin alumni
University of Dallas faculty
Roman Catholic Ecclesiastical Province of San Antonio
People from Williamson County, Texas
Catholics from Texas
Year of birth missing (living people)
21st-century American Roman Catholic priests